The Vancouver Island Junior Hockey League (VIJHL) is an unincorporated not-for-profit association which operates a junior "B" ice hockey league of 11 franchised member clubs, all of which are currently located in Canada, on Vancouver Island. The Brent Patterson Memorial Trophy is awarded annually to the league playoff champion at the end of each season. The winner of the Brent Patterson Memorial Trophy competes with the champions of the Kootenay International Junior Hockey League and the Pacific International Junior Hockey League for the Cyclone Taylor Cup, the British Columbia Junior B championship.

History
The most recent provincial Jr. B champions to come from the Vancouver Island Junior Hockey League are the Campbell River Storm in 2015, the Peninsula Panthers in 2011, the Victoria Cougars in 2007, and the Campbell River Storm again in 1999 during their dynasty of the league.  The only team in VIJHL history to ever win the Keystone Cup as Western Canadian champions are the 2015 Campbell River Storm. This has been accomplished multiple times by teams in the rival Pacific International Junior Hockey League and Kootenay International Junior Hockey League.

In 2012, the VIJHL announced the addition of two new franchises, the Nanaimo Buccaneers and the Westshore Wolves. The Buccaneers are the namesake of a team that played in the VIJHL in the 1970s. The Wolves are not new to the area either, but are replacing an unsuccessful team, the Westshore Stingers, that folded on December 4, 2010. On May 29th, 2021 the league announced two additional teams. The Lake Cowichan Kraken and the Port Alberni Bombers.

List of teams

 Notes

 An asterisk (*) denotes a franchise move. See the respective team articles for more information.

Brent Patterson Memorial Trophy Champions
Teams that went on to win the Cyclone Taylor Cup are listed in bold.

Total League Championships By Team

NHL alumni

See also
List of ice hockey teams in British Columbia

External links
Vancouver Island Jr Hockey League
Comox Valley Glacier Kings
Campbell River Storm
Kerry Park Islanders
Oceanside Generals
Peninsula Panthers
Saanich Braves
Victoria Cougars
Cyclone Taylor Cup website

Ice hockey leagues in British Columbia
B
1965 establishments in British Columbia
Sports leagues established in 1965